Starksia spinipenis, the phallic blenny, is a species of labrisomid blenny native to the Pacific coast of Mexico from the Gulf of California to Acapulco.  It prefers shallow sandy areas with weed growth.  This species can reach a length of  TL. The specific name is a compound noun if spinis meaning "spine" and penis, a reference to the first spine in the anal fin of the males which is elongated and free of the fin membrane and is modified as a copulatory organ, a characteristic of the genus Starksia.

References

spinipenis
Fish described in 1960